Methayalil Sree Bhagavati Kshetram (മലയാളം - മേത്തലയിൽ ശ്രീ ഭഗവതി ക്ഷേത്രം) is a Goddess Temple located in Eranhikkal, in the northern Kerala district Kozhikode (Calicut) near Canoly Canal. The temple is based on the Hindu goddess Kaali beliefs. Methalayil Temple performs Methalayil Thira Mahotsavam every year during the month of March. 

Devi temples in Kerala
Hindu temples in Kozhikode district